The 2010 NBA Finals was the championship series of the National Basketball Association's (NBA) 2009–10 season and conclusion of the season's playoffs, held from June 3 to June 17, 2010. A best-of-seven playoff series, it was contested between the Western Conference champion and defending champion Los Angeles Lakers and the Eastern Conference champion Boston Celtics. It was their twelfth Finals meeting overall.

The Los Angeles Lakers earned home court advantage for finishing the regular season with a better record. The heavily-favored Though the Lakers won the opening game on their home court, the Celtics led 3–2 entering Game 6 before Los Angeles rallied to win the next two games. Bryant was named Most Valuable Player of the Finals for the second consecutive year.

Series summary

The Lakers had won the previous season's NBA Finals against the Orlando Magic for the franchise's 15th championship. The Celtics won their previous NBA Finals appearance against the Lakers in 2008. This was the 12th Finals played between the two rival teams.

Background

2010 NBA Playoffs

Regular-season series
The regular season series was split, with each team winning on the opponent's court by only a point:

Boston Celtics

The Celtics finished the regular season as the Atlantic Division champion with a 50–32 record. As the No. 4 seed in the Eastern Conference, they eliminated the No. 5 seeded Miami Heat in five games during the first round in the playoffs. Then in the conference semifinals, Boston defeated the Cleveland Cavaliers in six games, the earliest that a top seed has been eliminated since the Dallas Mavericks' first round loss to the Golden State Warriors in 2007. In the Eastern Conference finals, the Celtics went on to eliminate the Orlando Magic in six games. In reaching the Finals the Boston Celtics became the first team in NBA history to do so with a better regular season road record than home. Also, the Boston Celtics became the second team in NBA history to reach the NBA Finals after beating the team with the best record, Cleveland Cavaliers, and team with second-best record in the league, Orlando Magic, after the Houston Rockets did it in their championship season of 1995.

Los Angeles Lakers

After the Lakers won the Finals in the preceding year, the team management wasted no time in making changes to the roster. Their most notable offseason player change was when Trevor Ariza departed to the Houston Rockets and was replaced by free agent Ron Artest. Longtime assistant coach and former head coach Kurt Rambis left the organization to pursue a head coaching opportunity with the Minnesota Timberwolves. The Lakers finished the regular season as the Pacific Division champion, compiling a 57–25 record. On February 1, Kobe Bryant moved past Jerry West into 14th place on the NBA's career scoring list. He also surpassed West to become the Lakers franchise scoring leader.

As the No. 1 seed in the Western Conference, they eliminated the No. 8 seeded Oklahoma City Thunder in six games during the Western Conference First Round Playoffs, with the final game ending when Kobe Bryant missed a jumper but Pau Gasol grabbed the offensive rebound and made a layup to clinch the win. Then in the Western Conference Semifinals, Los Angeles swept the Utah Jazz in four games, earning their right to play in their third straight Western Conference Final. In the Western Conference Finals against the Phoenix Suns, the Lakers won both of their first two games at home, but proceeded to lose the next two in Phoenix both by 9 points. In Game 5, Ron Artest made an off balance layup to beat the buzzer off a Kobe Bryant miss to give the Lakers the victory. The Lakers then proceeded to beat the Suns on their home floor in Game 6 led by Kobe Bryant's 37 points. The Game 6 victory gave the Lakers their 31st NBA Finals appearance in franchise history. The team also earned their third straight consecutive appearance in the Finals, with the last team to achieve such a feat being the 2000-2002 Los Angeles Lakers themselves.

Game summaries

All times are in Eastern Daylight Time (UTC−4).  If the venue is located in a different time zone, the local time is also given.

Game 1

Both teams started strong, playing a close game for most of the 1st quarter until a 7–2 Los Angeles run inspired by bench players Jordan Farmar and Shannon Brown to end the quarter. Boston again started the 2nd quarter strong. However, Los Angeles managed to extend the lead 50–41 at the end of the first half with another run led by Ron Artest and Pau Gasol. More of the same came in the 3rd quarter, as Los Angeles matched nearly all of Boston's attempts to get back in the game. To end the 3rd quarter, Los Angeles went on a 15–4 run to give L. A. a 20-point lead going into the 4th quarter. While the Celtics would try to get back into the game with Nate Robinson and 2008 Finals MVP Paul Pierce, they never got closer than 11 points. The game was capped off with a three-pointer by Kobe Bryant with 3.6 seconds left, securing his 10th 30-point game in his last 11. Boston was outplayed by Los Angeles in nearly every statistical category, most notably in rebounding (31–42) and second-chance points (0–16). Much of the Celtics' performance came from Kevin Garnett, who finished with 16 points (on 16 shots) and 2 rebounds. Ray Allen, who was hampered by foul trouble, finished with 12 points and 5 personal fouls.

Game 2

Boston came out much more aggressively to begin game 2. Los Angeles fought back (Pau Gasol had nine points in the quarter) and managed to reduce Boston's lead to seven points at the end of the 1st quarter. In the 2nd quarter, Ray Allen hit an impressive five three-pointers (only missing once) to add to the two that he hit in the first quarter. This explosive offensive output pushed Boston forward and allowed them to lead by as many as 14 points. Kobe Bryant and Los Angeles put up a quick 7–0 run to end the first half to cut it to a 54–48 Boston lead. Foul trouble plagued players of both squads, with many players having three fouls going into the break. The Lakers would continue their attack and managed to take the lead 57–56 early in the 3rd. Both teams fought hard, leading to the 72–72 tie going into the 4th. The final quarter was dominated by the Celtics, though, as Rajon Rondo's 10 points in the quarter helped tie the series 1–1. Rondo finished with an impressive triple-double of 19 points, 12 rebounds and 10 assists, and Allen hit eight of 11 three-pointers to secure the NBA Finals record.
The last Finals series to be tied at 1–1 after two games was the 2004 NBA Finals which involved the Lakers and the Detroit Pistons.

Game 3

Prior to the start of the game, singer Monica performed the national anthem. Kevin Garnett scored the first six points of the game to give the Celtics a 6–0 lead and eventually helped the team to a seven-point lead (12–5) early in the first quarter. Following the first full timeout of the game, the Lakers scored 13 straight points thanks in part to free throws by Kobe Bryant and Pau Gasol. After the score was tied at 16–16, the Lakers outscored the Celtics 10–1 for the remainder of the first quarter.

The Lakers' 32–8 run continued well into the second quarter when Bryant completed a free throw after being fouled by forward Glen "Big Baby" Davis en route to making a layup 43 seconds into the game. Further helping to widen the gap was Shannon Brown who made a 20-foot jumper from a Lamar Odom assist. Odom, Farmar, and Bynum also made shots to widen the score to 17 points above Boston. The Celtics would soon create their own comeback with an 11–4 run before the Lakers called for a full timeout. Bryant made jumper on a Gasol assist while Pierce shot another three-pointer on a Rondo assist. The final two minutes of the first half ended in a shootout both Celtics and Lakers starters resulting in a 52–40 Los Angeles lead.

The first few minutes of the second half proved to be a slow start for both teams as Boston piled 2–8 shooting while Los Angeles posted 2–11 shooting before the first full timeout. Gasol made a 20-foot jumper to give the Lakers their first points of the third quarter; Garnett responded by a 20-foot jumper. Shortly after making his third shot from beyond-the-arc, Pierce received his fourth foul sending him to the bench. Odom, who replaced a limping Bynum, also earned two fouls of his own in addition to bad passing. The Celtics soon took advantage of the Lakers problems when Davis, Tony Allen, and Rasheed Wallace managed to successfully hit several critical shots to end the quarter on a six-point deficit.

The Celtics continued their momentum into the fourth quarter eventually pulling to within one point after two minutes. After coming off the bench to replace a struggling Gasol in the fourth quarter, Derek Fisher made a 12-foot jumper in what would be another of his finest postseason performances in his career. He then made four consecutive shots to give the Lakers a 78–73 lead before earning a foul on Ray Allen. With 1:40 left in the game, Bryant made his lone shot of the quarter despite posting 25 points in the first three periods combined. Foul troubles for both Garnett and Pierce hurt the Celtics chances of closing the gap with the Lakers. Pierce made one final layup with five seconds left in the game, but the Lakers edged the Celtics with a 91–84 victory to take a 2–1 lead in the series. Bryant was the leading scorer of the game with 29 points; Garnett's 25 points bested all other Celtics players for Game 3. Derek Fisher scored 11 of his 16 points in the fourth quarter. Compared to his record eight three-point field goals in Game 2, Ray Allen went a near-record 0–13 in field goals for this game.

Game 4

After the first quarter, the Celtics held a 19–16 lead; Paul Pierce scored eight points in the quarter for Boston, while Pau Gasol had eight points for Los Angeles. The Lakers rebounded to take a three-point lead entering halftime. Los Angeles maintained a two-point lead following the third quarter, in which Kobe Bryant made three three-point baskets. Early in the fourth quarter, the Celtics went on a run that gave them control of the game; with a lineup that featured four reserves, Boston outscored the Lakers 13–2 over nearly half the quarter. The Celtics held an 11-point lead with 3:57 remaining, but the Lakers mounted a late comeback bid behind Bryant, who posted 10 of the final 12 points for Los Angeles. Three free throws with 1:08 remaining pulled the Lakers within 92–86, and they had an opportunity to get closer in the final minute; however, a Bryant pass was stolen by Rondo, who subsequently made a layup to extend the Celtics' lead. Pierce led Boston with 19 points in the game. The Celtics benefitted from strong bench play, as their reserves doubled the scoring of the Lakers' backups. Davis scored 18 points (nine in the fourth quarter) and Nate Robinson added 12. For the Lakers, Bryant and Gasol, with 33 and 21 points respectively, accounted for most of the team's scoring. Andrew Bynum was unable to play in the second half because of a knee injury.

Game 5

Boston started the game with a 6–0 run, and ended the first quarter leading by 2 on a strong performance by Paul Pierce. After a short Laker run, the Celtics pushed the lead to 6 by the end of the half, with Pierce shooting 7–10, scoring 15 points, despite the Celtics only getting to the free-throw line six times. Pierce's three-pointer pushed the Celtics' lead to double digits, 50–39, early in the third quarter, but the Lakers chipped away at that lead to bring it down to 8, as the Celtics went into the fourth quarter attempting to maintain a 73–65 advantage. With the Celtics leading by 12 with less than three minutes to play, seven straight free throws by the Lakers cut the lead to 87–82 with a little over 40 seconds in the game. On an inbounds play, Garnett lobbed the ball to Pierce, who, while falling out of bounds, hurled it toward a streaking Rondo, who laid it up and in, essentially icing the game with a 7-point lead with 35 seconds to play. Garnett chipped in with 18 points and 10 rebounds. Rondo played well, shooting 9–12 from the floor for 18 points, 8 assists and 5 rebounds. The game featured a 38-point performance by Bryant (hitting numerous shots in the 3rd quarter), being the only Lakers player to score over 12 points and one of only two in double figures. Pierce, on the other hand, would dominate the game with 27 points on 57% shooting from the floor.
This was the Celtics' last win in the NBA Finals until Game 1 of the 2022 NBA Finals.

Game 6

The Lakers returned to Los Angeles with a 3–2 deficit in the series. This was an elimination game for them, and the Celtics were one game away from the championship. Boston starting center Kendrick Perkins suffered a serious knee injury in the first quarter, rendering the Celtics more vulnerable on defense and rebounding. The desperate Lakers opened up a massive lead, peaking at 27. The Lakers' bench had outscored Boston's bench 24–0 entering the fourth quarter.

It was later revealed that Perkins tore both his PCL and MCL, and he was ruled out for Game 7. His Lakers counterpart, Andrew Bynum left the game early in the third quarter due to swelling in his knee from a torn meniscus. He, however, was not ruled out for Game 7.

Game 7

This game was the first Game 7 in an NBA Finals since  five years earlier. Both the Celtics and Lakers kept the game close early in the first quarter with each team holding a one-point lead. Suddenly, the Lakers offense began to falter with starters missing field goals and easy layups. The Celtics utilized their opponents struggles to widen their lead. After the team's first full timeout, the Celtics managed to outscore the Lakers 6–1, with Davis scoring four points on questionable calls. Boston held the Lakers to only 14 points and took a 23–14 lead ending the first quarter.

At the start of the second quarter, the Lakers got back in the game by scoring 11 straight points to take a two-point lead over Boston. The lead proved to be brief, however, as Rajon Rondo and Kevin Garnett scored two-pointers to regain control of the game. Nevertheless, the Lakers continued to score points, with Ron Artest hitting 3 of his 4 free throws in the quarter to maintain a four-point deficit. Before the second quarter concluded, Paul Pierce sunk a pair of free throws to end the first half with a 40–34 Celtics lead.

The Celtics opened the second half going on a 9–2 run which widened their lead over the Lakers by as much as 13 points, 49–36. The turning point for the Lakers however arrived after the team took a twenty-second timeout. Bryant made a running jumper on a Lamar Odom assist in what would turn out to be a 6–2 run by the Lakers cutting their deficit to six points behind Boston. Pierce then scored hit a three-pointer to restore the lead to nine. As the third quarter drew to a close, the Lakers continued their momentum as Bryant completed a 4-foot jumper while Gasol hit two free throws. Lakers reserve Lamar Odom made a tip shot to make the score 57–53 at the end of the quarter.

The Lakers' fortunes rode high midway through the fourth quarter as Fisher sunk a three-point field goal from 26-feet to tie the game at 64. Despite having a poor night offensively, Bryant hit two free throws and followed through with a 17-foot shot to give the Lakers a 68–64 lead, the team's first lead since early in the second quarter. Gasol hit two more free throws on a Garnett foul to extend that margin to six. The Celtics would not give up, however, as with Lakers leading by 6 with a minute-and-a-half remaining, Wallace hit a three-pointer to cut the Lakers' lead to 76–73. Although Artest exhibited shooting difficulties throughout the game, he answered in spectacular fashion by sinking a three-point goal to restore his team's lead back to six with a minute remaining in the game. It would prove to be the lethal blow for the Celtics. The Celtic offense suffered heavily in the fourth quarter as four key players (Garnett, Davis, Pierce, and Wallace) earned four or more personal fouls. Wallace would later depart from the game after fouling out. After Artest's three, Allen would respond with a three-pointer of his own to cut the Lakers' lead to three again. In the ensuing play, Bryant attempted a three, but the three missed. Fortunately for the Lakers, Gasol was there to get the crucial offensive rebound. Gasol then passed the ball to Bryant, who was then fouled by Wallace, fouling him out. Bryant attained two more free throws on Wallace's foul to extend the lead to five, 81–76. After a Celtic timeout, Allen attempted a three-pointer but he missed it. Rondo grabbed the offensive rebound and hit a three-pointer to bring the Celtics within two, 81–79. However, the Celtics were forced to foul Sasha Vujačić, consequently enabling the Laker guard to complete two free throws and help his team take a four-point lead, 83–79, over Boston. With 11.7 seconds left in the game, Rondo made one last-ditch effort to revive the Celtics' hopes by attempting a three-pointer. The ball missed the basket enabling Gasol to make a defensive rebound. Gasol passed the ball to Odom who quickly threw it to the opposite end of the court as the buzzer sounded.

Bryant, despite shooting 6 for 24 from the field, scored 10 of his game-high 23 points in the fourth quarter. He was named the Finals MVP for the second straight season. Pierce led the Celtics with 18 points and ten rebounds, but he shot 5–15 from the field. The Lakers had 23 offensive rebounds and out-rebounded the Celtics, 53–40. Gasol had 18 rebounds and Bryant added 15. Los Angeles shot 37 free throws to Boston's 17. After the game, Lakers head coach Phil Jackson hailed Artest, who scored 20 points in Game 7 including his last-second three-pointer, as the "Most Valuable Player" of the game.

Statistics

Rosters

Los Angeles Lakers

Boston Celtics

Player statistics

Los Angeles Lakers

|-
| align="left" |  || 7 || 7 || 35.9 || .361 || .344 || .550 || 4.6 || 1.3 || 1.4 || 0.6 || 10.6
|-
| align="left" |  || 7 || 0 || 12.1 || .450 || .000 || 1.000 || 0.9 || 0.4 || 0.0 || 0.1 || 3.0
|-! style="background:#FDE910;"
| align="left" |  || 7 || 7 || 41.2 || .405 || .319 || .883 || 8.0 || 3.9 || 2.1 || 0.7 || 28.6
|-
| align="left" |  || 7 || 7 || 24.9 || .452 || .000 || .700 || 5.1 || 0.0 || 0.1 || 1.3 || 7.4
|-
| align="left" |  || 7 || 0 || 12.6 || .321 || .200 || .500 || 1.1 || 0.9 || 1.1 || 0.0 || 3.0
|-
| align="left" |  || 7 || 7 || 30.6 || .420 || .200 || .941 || 3.0 || 2.0 || 0.9 || 0.0 || 8.6
|-
| align="left" |  || 7 || 7 || 41.9 || .478 || .000 || .721 || 11.6 || 3.7 || 0.7 || 2.6 || 18.6
|-
| align="left" |  || 1 || 0 || 2.7 || .000 || .000 || .000 || 1.0 || 0.0 || 0.0 || 0.0 || 0.0
|-
| align="left" |  || 7 || 0 || 27.4 || .489 || .100 || .545 || 6.6 || 1.3 || 0.6 || 0.6 || 7.6
|-
| align="left" |  || 2 || 0 || 4.1 || .000 || .000 || .000 || 0.5 || 0.0 || 0.0 || 0.0 || 0.0
|-
| align="left" |  || 7 || 0 || 7.4 || .375 || .400 || .833 || 1.0 || 0.7 || 0.3 || 0.0 || 3.0
|-
| align="left" |  || 4 || 0 || 7.8 || .333 || .000 || .000 || 0.5 || 0.8 || 0.0 || 0.5 || 0.5

Boston Celtics

|-
| align="left" |  || 7 || 7 || 39.4 || .367 || .293 || .960 || 2.7 || 1.7 || 0.7 || 0.0 || 14.6
|-
| align="left" |  || 7 || 0 || 14.7 || .333 || .000 || .857 || 1.0 || 0.4 || 1.0 || 0.7 || 3.1
|-
| align="left" |  || 2 || 0 || 2.2 || .500 || 1.000 || 1.000 || 0.5 || 0.0 || 0.0 || 0.0 || 2.5
|-
| align="left" |  || 7 || 0 || 20.6 || .462 || .000 || .688 || 5.6 || 0.4 || 0.9 || 0.4 || 6.7
|-
| align="left" |  || 2 || 0 || 2.6 || .000 || .000 || .000 || 0.0 || 0.0 || 0.0 || 0.0 || 0.0
|-
| align="left" |  || 7 || 7 || 31.7 || .511 || .000 || .895 || 5.6 || 3.0 || 1.4 || 1.3 || 15.3
|-
| align="left" |  || 6 || 6 || 23.5 || .571 || .000 || .647 || 5.8 || 1.0 || 0.2 || 0.0 || 5.8
|-
| align="left" |  || 7 || 7 || 39.8 || .439 || .400 || .865 || 5.3 || 3.0 || 0.7 || 0.9 || 18.0
|-
| align="left" |  || 7 || 0 || 10.1 || .400 || .333 || 1.000 || 1.1 || 1.9 || 0.1 || 0.0 || 4.9
|-
| align="left" |  || 7 || 7 || 38.8 || .454 || .333 || .263 || 6.3 || 7.6 || 1.6 || 0.3 || 13.6
|-
| align="left" |  || 1 || 0 || 0.9 || .000 || .000 || .000 || 0.0 || 0.0 || 0.0 || 0.0 || 0.0
|-
| align="left" |  || 7 || 1 || 20.6 || .366 || .238 || 1.000 || 4.6 || 0.9 || 0.4 || 0.7 || 5.3
|-
| align="left" |  || 2 || 0 || 9.2 || .000 || .000 || .000 || 2.0 || 0.0 || 0.0 || 0.0 || 0.0

Broadcasting
For the eighth consecutive year in the United States, ABC televised the Finals. Mike Breen, Jeff Van Gundy and Mark Jackson provided commentary for the games. The Finals was also broadcast on ESPN Radio, with Jim Durham, Hubie Brown and Jack Ramsay calling the action. Game 1 was watched by 14.1 million viewers, the most watched Finals opening game since . The viewership for the opening game resulted in a ratings percentage of 8.6% of households in the United States. Game 7 had the highest average number of viewers with 28.2 million, since  when 35.9 million watched the Chicago Bulls defeat the Utah Jazz in Game 6 of that year's Finals. The average number of viewers of 18.1 million, was the highest since . The flagship radio stations of the respective teams broadcast all Series games with their local announcers. In Los Angeles, KSPN carried the Lakers' English-language broadcasts, with Spero Dedes and Mychal Thompson announcing, while KWKW aired the team's Spanish broadcasts. In Boston, WEEI carried the Celtics' English broadcasts with Sean Grande and Cedric Maxwell announcing.

Impact and aftermath
Lakers head coach Phil Jackson earned his 11th title, further extending his record for most championships earned by either an NBA coach or any coach/manager in a major North American professional sports league. Bryant won his second consecutive NBA Finals MVP Award. He later said that this championship win was the "sweetest" because it was against the longtime, storied rivals and was the toughest series by far.

Lakers

The series win brought the Lakers' franchise NBA championship total to 16, second only to the Celtics' 17 championships. This also marked the 11th title for the team since moving from Minneapolis in 1960, and it was the franchise's fifth Finals win in eleven seasons. Notably, this was the Lakers' first Game 7 win over the Celtics in Finals history, Boston had won all previous matchups. Moreover, the Lakers were now 3–9 against Boston since the two teams first competed against each other in the  NBA Finals.

On June 21, a victory parade took place for the Lakers. Unlike like previous years, however, there was no pep rally that followed after the end of the parade due to both security and financial reasons. The team was transported around on an open-air float equipped with loudspeakers enabling the players to talk to the spectators. The parade began at 11 a.m local time at Staples Center, turned east on Chick Heart Court, turned south onto Figueroa Street, then east onto Jefferson Boulevard before entering beneath Interstate 110. The parade concluded at the intersection of Jefferson Boulevard and Grand Avenue near the University of Southern California's Galen Center. Occasionally, Ron Artest led the crowd in chanting "Boston sucks!" Over 65,000 people were estimated to have attended the parade. Most of the 2009–10 Lakers team were on hand to receive their championship rings before the start of the season opener against the Houston Rockets on October 26. They also visited U.S. president Barack Obama at the THEARC Boys and Girls Club in Washington, DC. in December 2010, presenting him with a banner declaring the Lakers as 2009–10 NBA World Champions.

In November, Time Capsule Press published a book entitled Journey to the Ring: Behind the Scenes with the 2010 NBA Champions Lakers. The book, written by coach Jackson, featured various photographs from sports photographer Andrew D. Bernstein chronicling the Lakers 2009–10 season en route to their triumph against the Celtics.

They did not return to the Finals until , defeating the Miami Heat and winning their 17th title, which tied the Celtics for the most in league history.

Celtics
Allen departed for the Miami Heat in 2012, while Pierce and Garnett were traded to the Brooklyn Nets the following offseason. Also in the 2013 offseason, Rivers took over as the Los Angeles Clippers head coach, and the last remaining piece of the “Big Four”, Rondo, was traded to the Dallas Mavericks early in the 2014–15 season. Rondo would ironically join the Lakers in 2018 and win
a championship with them in 2020. The Celtics did not return to the Finals until 2022, attempting to win their 18th title (which would've broke a tie with the Lakers for the most in franchise history). Their Finals record remained tied when the Golden State Warriors won the series in 6 games.

References

External links

2010 NBA Finals at ESPN
2010 NBA Finals at Basketball Reference

National Basketball Association Finals
Finals
NBA
NBA
2010 in sports in California
NBA Finals
NBA Finals
Basketball competitions in Boston
NBA Finals
NBA Finals
Basketball competitions in Los Angeles